Serafino De Tivoli (March 18261892) was an Italian painter of the Macchiaioli group.

Biography

He was born in Livorno. After initial study of literature at a religious private school in Florence, he began his artistic training under Carlo Markò the Elder. He met Vito D'Ancona during the mid-1840s, and joined him in painting landscapes en plein air.

In 1848 he fought as a Tuscan volunteer for Garibaldi in the Risorgimento. In 1855 his paintings, exhibited at the Florentine Promotrice  exhibition, brought him to the attention of the artists who frequented the Caffè Michelangiolo in Florence (including those who would later become known as the Macchiaioli). In that same year he traveled to Paris, where he was greatly impressed by the paintings of the Barbizon school. He saw in their realism and powerful chiaroscuro a means of renewing art in the modern age. Upon his return to Florence he conveyed this new enthusiasm to his friends, who quickly adopted his ideas. In recognition of the influence he had on his fellow Florentine artists, Telemaco Signorini called him "the father of the macchia".

De Tivoli made additional visits to  Paris, and in 1863 he exhibited in the Salon des Refusés. In 1873 he moved to Paris, where he met such artists as Tissot and Pissarro, and became a friend of Degas. He returned to Florence in 1890, where he lived in relative isolation until his death in 1892.

Notes

References
Broude, Norma (1987). The Macchiaioli: Italian Painters of the Nineteenth Century. New Haven and London: Yale University Press. 
Steingräber, E., & Matteucci, G. (1984). The Macchiaioli: Tuscan Painters of the Sunlight : March 14-April 20, 1984. New York: Stair Sainty Matthiesen in association with Matthiesen, London. 

1826 births
1892 deaths
People from Livorno
Livornese Jews
19th-century Italian painters
Italian male painters
19th-century Italian male artists